Shaun Murray (born 7 February 1970) is an English former professional footballer who played in midfield. He made half of his appearances at Bradford City.

Playing career
Murray was a trainee at Tottenham Hotspur where he was unable to make a single appearance. Instead, in 1989 he signed for Portsmouth for £100,000. Appearances were still limited and he played just 34 games in more than three seasons. He moved north to Scarborough where he played 29 times in his one season.

Bradford City spent £200,000 in 1994 to bring the midfielder to Valley Parade. Murray was a regular in his first two seasons at Bradford and he helped them to promotion in 1995–96 although he failed to earn a place in the play-off final against Notts County. Murray struggled to break into the team the following season until Chris Waddle left. Murray played the last 12 games of the season to help City avoid relegation in the final game. 1997–98 was Murray's final season at City after which he had played 130 games for the club, during which time he scored eight goals – five in his first season.

Murray moved to Notts County on a free transfer before he finished his career at Kettering Town.

External links

1970 births
Living people
Footballers from Newcastle upon Tyne
English footballers
Association football midfielders
Tottenham Hotspur F.C. players
Portsmouth F.C. players
Scarborough F.C. players
Bradford City A.F.C. players
Notts County F.C. players
Kettering Town F.C. players
English Football League players
National League (English football) players